Paul Hoban is an Irish hurler who is a member of the Galway senior team and also plays with his club Loughrea.

He was an unused substitute in the 2012 All-Ireland Senior Hurling Championship Final against Kilkenny.

References

References

External links
Score Profile

Living people
Galway inter-county hurlers
Loughrea hurlers
1991 births